Diceratosaurus is an extinct genus of nectridean lepospondyl within the family Keraterpetontidae. Fossils of Diceratosaurus were first described by Edward Drinker Cope in 1874. The species D. brevirostris is well known from Jefferson County, Ohio, with approximately 50 specimens having been collected from the Ohio Diamond Coal Mine. The mine was situated in the village of Linton, which became obscure soon after operations were completed and the mine closed in 1921.

See also
 Prehistoric amphibian
 List of prehistoric amphibians

References

Carboniferous amphibians of North America
Diplocaulids
Carboniferous amphibians
Fossil taxa described in 1903